The Gulf Coast Limited was a passenger train operated by Amtrak in the southern United States. It ran daily from Mobile, Alabama, to New Orleans Union Passenger Terminal in New Orleans, Louisiana.

Route 
The Gulf Coast Limited operated over a  route from New Orleans to Mobile, hugging the coast of the Gulf of Mexico. The majority of this route is now owned by CSX Transportation (NO&M Subdivision), save a few miles around the New Orleans Union Passenger Terminal and East City Junction, which are owned by Amtrak and the Norfolk Southern Railway, respectively.

History 

Up to the latter 1960s, the New Orleans to Mobile route was served by several passenger trains a day. The Louisville & Nashville operated the daily trains, Gulf Wind (New Orleans–Jacksonville), Pan-American (New Orleans–Cincinnati) and Humming Bird (New Orleans–Cincinnati), as well as an additional unnamed day train (New Orleans–Jacksonville). Additionally, the Southern Railway operated the Crescent (New Orleans–New York) on the route.

The Gulf Coast Limited was also the name of a train operated by the Atlantic Coast Line Railroad between New York and the west coast of Florida.

First iteration 
The Gulf Coast Limited grew out of a feasibility study conducted by the Louisiana-Mississippi-Alabama Rapid Rail Transit Commission in the early 1980s. The study sought a commuter rail service centered on New Orleans linking Baton Rouge, Louisiana, Slidell, Louisiana, or Mobile, Alabama. In the end the Commission opted for a New Orleans—Mobile service, prompted in part by the 1984 Louisiana World Exposition. The three states entered into a 403(b) arrangement with Amtrak; under this provision Amtrak undertakes to operate a service but the contracting states subsidize most of the cost. The first train ran on April 29, 1984.

In the fall Amtrak explored extending the Gulf Coast Limited from Mobile to Birmingham, Alabama (a route later served by the Gulf Breeze), but did not alter the train's route. The train was popular, but service ended on January 6, 1985, after Mississippi declined to continue its support.

Second iteration 
Amtrak revived the Gulf Coast Limited on June 27, 1996, following the cancellation of the Gulf Breeze. The states of Alabama, Louisiana, and Mississippi each contributed $185,000 for a 90-day trial run. Amtrak estimated that yearly operation would cost $3.1 million. The train used the same route as its 1984 precursor but did not stop in East New Orleans. Initial ridership was higher than expected: a standard consist could seat 134, but weekend trains regularly carried 300, against 50–60 on weekdays. A federal appropriation allowed Amtrak to extend the Gulf Coast Limited six months beyond the trial period, but additional state money was not forthcoming. Service ended March 31, 1997.

Planned restoration 
In February 2021, it was announced that passenger rail service would be returning to the Gulf Coast in the form of a new Amtrak train from New Orleans to Mobile, following the same route as the Gulf Coast Limited. The train would stop at Bay St. Louis, Gulfport, Biloxi, and Pascagoula, and Amtrak is aiming to begin service by the end of 2023.

See also 
Gulf Breeze
Sunset Limited

References

External links 
Southern High-Speed Rail Commission
1984 timetable
1996 timetable

Former Amtrak routes
Passenger rail transportation in Alabama
Passenger rail transportation in Louisiana
Passenger rail transportation in Mississippi
Railway services introduced in 1984
Railway services discontinued in 1985
Railway services introduced in 1996
Railway services discontinued in 1997
Proposed Amtrak routes